The Great Resignation, also known as the Big Quit and the Great Reshuffle, is an ongoing economic trend in which employees have voluntarily resigned from their jobs en masse, beginning in early 2021 in the wake of the COVID-19 pandemic. Among the most cited reasons for resigning include wage stagnation amid rising cost of living, limited opportunities for career advancement, hostile work environments, lack of benefits, inflexible remote-work policies, and long-lasting job dissatisfaction. Most likely to quit have been workers in hospitality, healthcare, and education.

Some economists have described the Great Resignation as akin to a general strike. However, workforce participation in some regions has recovered or even exceeded the pre-pandemic rate. This suggests that instead of remaining out of the workforce for extended periods (which can be financially difficult, especially at a time of high inflation), many workers have been simply swapping jobs.

The term "Great Resignation" was coined by Anthony Klotz, a professor of management at University College London's School of Management, in May 2021, when he predicted a sustained mass exodus.

Background 

Between December 2000, when quit rates were first measured by the United States Department of Labor, and February 2021, roughly a year following the beginning of the COVID-19 pandemic, the U.S. resignation rate never surpassed 2.4% of the total workforce per month. High quit rates indicate worker confidence in the ability to get higher paying jobs, which typically coincides with high economic stability and low unemployment rates. Conversely, during periods of high unemployment, resignation rates tend to decrease as hire rates also decrease. For example, during the Great Recession, the U.S. quit rate decreased from 2.0% to 1.3% as the hire rate fell from 3.7% to 2.8%.

Resignation rates in the U.S. during the pandemic initially followed this pattern. In March and April 2020, a record 13.0 and 9.3 million workers (8.6% and 7.2%) were laid off, and the quit rate subsequently fell to a seven-year low of 1.6%. Much of the layoffs and resignations were driven by women, who disproportionately work in industries that were affected most by the lockdowns, like service industries and childcare.

As the pandemic continued, however, workers began to quit their jobs in large numbers despite initially high unemployment.

Causes

According to Microsoft's Work Trend Index, more than 40% of the global workforce were considering quitting their job in 2021. The COVID-19 pandemic allowed workers to rethink their careers, work conditions, and long-term goals. As many workplaces attempted to bring their employees in-person, workers desired the freedom that remote work afforded them during the COVID-19 pandemic, as well as schedule flexibility, which was the primary reason to look for a new job of the majority of those studied by Bankrate in August 2021. Additionally, many workers, particularly in younger cohorts, are seeking to gain a better work–life balance. In the U.S., connections are also being drawn to reported increases in workplace stress and employee burnout. Moreover, millions of people now have long COVID; this disability can alter the ability or desire to work.  Lambert (2022) finds that the concept of labor market segmentation is useful in explaining resignation rates across different industries 

Restaurants and hotels, industries that require in-person interactions, have been hit the hardest by waves of resignations. COVID-19 stimulus payments and rises in unemployment benefits allowed those who relied on low-wage jobs for survival to stay home, although places where unemployment benefits were rolled back did not see significant job creation as a result. On the other hand, many workers who are dissatisfied with their jobs report that they cannot resign due to economic barriers, many of these workers being people of color. Sekou Siby, president and CEO of the U.S. nonprofit Restaurant Opportunities Center United, commented, "There's more competition across industries, so workers are feeling more empowered than ever before, but that doesn't mean everyone is able to leave their current jobs."

According to a study conducted by Adobe, the exodus is being driven by Millennials and Generation Z, who are more likely to be dissatisfied with their work. More than half of Gen Z reported planning to seek a new job within the next year. Harvard Business Review found that the cohort between 30 and 45 years old had the greatest increase in resignation rates. Racial minority, low-wage, and frontline workers are also more dissatisfied with their work in the United States, according to the asset management firm Mercer.

An IMF working paper by Carlo Pizzinelli and Ippei Shibata focused on causes of the loss in employment within the U.S. and U.K. labor markets in comparison to pre-COVID-19 levels. They identified job mismatch (that is, mismatch between the areas where people search for work and where the most vacancies are) as playing a "modest" role, being less significant than in the wake of the global financial crisis. The effect of the pandemic on women, sparking the so-called "She-cession", was deemed as accounting for some 16% of the total U.S. employment shortfall but little to none of the shortfall in the U.K. Meanwhile, the authors attribute 35% of the shortfall in both the U.K. and U.S. to older workers (aged 55–74) withdrawing from the labor force. On the other side, Harvard Business Review reported resignation rates for those aged 60–70 actually fell in 2021 (in comparison to 2020 rates).

Some suggest that the tightness of the labor market is not due to workers resigning en masse or turning towards self-employment, but instead due to a shortage of migrant workers caused by travel restrictions during the pandemic and a general rise in anti-immigrant sentiment.

Impacts 
There is disagreement as to whether or not the Great Resignation will have a lasting effect. Although quit rates remain high, many workers in Western countries have been returning to the labor force in large numbers in late 2021 and early 2022. In general, an aging population and a labor shortage accelerate industrial automation, not just to replace the "missing" workers but also to cut costs.

Australia  
In February 2022, Australian treasurer Josh Frydenberg reported that the labor market had been experiencing a “Great Reshuffle” rather than a “Great Resignation”. He also reported that over one million workers started new jobs in the three months prior to November 2021, an increase of almost 10% prior to the pre-pandemic average. In the three months prior to February 2022, 300,000 workers reported resigning for better job opportunities, a record number. A main incentive may have been higher pay, as the typical Australian worker who switched jobs received a pay bump of 8% to 10%.

China 

A similar social protest movement is occurring in China, referred to as tang ping. It started roughly during the same time as the Great Resignation, in April 2021. It is a rejection of societal pressures to overwork, such as in the 996 working hour system. Those who participate in tang ping instead choose to "lie down flat and get over the beatings"  via a low-desire, more indifferent attitude towards life. Business magazine ABC Money claimed the lifestyle resonated with youth disillusioned by the government-endorsed "Chinese Dream", which encourages a life of hard work and sacrifice without life satisfaction to show for it. The Chinese Communist Party (CCP) has worked to reject the idea through state-owned media and internet censorship, though some party voices offer that the movement provides an opportunity to reflect on how best to cultivate diligence in young generations.

Europe
A survey by HR company SD Worx of 5,000 people in Belgium, France, the U.K., Germany, and the Netherlands, found that employees in Germany had the most COVID-19-related resignations, with 6.0% of the workers leaving their jobs. This was followed by the United Kingdom with 4.7%, the Netherlands with 2.9%, and France with 2.3%. Belgium had the least number of resignations with 1.9%.

Some preliminary data show an increase in the number of quits in Italy, starting in the second quarter of 2021. The registered increase was not only in absolute terms, but also in terms of quit rate (computed as quits over employed population) and of quit share (computed as quits over total contract terminations).

In the United Kingdom between July and September 2021, over 400,000 workers left their jobs, up from 270,000 two years prior. There were a record high 1.3 million job vacancies in December 2021, or 4.4 vacancies for every 100 jobs. The U.K. workforce got smaller in 2020, the first time in over twenty years, largely due to older people retiring according to Tony Wilson, director of the Institute for Employment Studies. Between October and December 2021, the rate of U.K. workers aged 16 to 64 moving job-to-job was at an all-time high of 3.2%. Workers in their 30s (Millennials) are the most likely to quit their jobs, followed by those in their 20s (Generation Z). However, by August 2022, many British workers have returned to their previous positions after quitting and some elderly Britons have opted out of retirement in order to pay their bills in the wake of high inflation.

Some industries, like nursing, have been hit especially hard by burnout. In October 2021, before the Omicron variant caused a new wave of cases, the Royal College of Nursing conducted a survey of over 9,000 British nursing staff in which 57% of respondents were either thinking about leaving or actively planning to leave their jobs. The primary factors reported were feeling undervalued, exhausted, and not being able to give adequate care.

India  
India has witnessed large scale resignations across many sectors of the economy. The information technology sector in particular witnessed massive attrition, with over a million resignations in 2021.

United States 
In April 2021, a record 4.0 million Americans quit their jobs. In June 2021, approximately 3.9 million American workers quit their jobs. Resignations are consistently the most prevalent in the South, where 2.9% of the workforce voluntarily left their jobs in June, followed by the Midwest (2.8%) and the West (2.6%). The Northeast is the most stable region, with 2.0% of workers quitting in June.

According to a PricewaterhouseCoopers survey conducted in early August 2021, 65% of employees said they were looking for a new job and 88% of executives said their company was experiencing higher turnover than normal. A Deloitte study published in Fortune magazine in October 2021 found that among Fortune 1000 companies, 73% of CEOs anticipated the work shortage would disrupt their businesses over the next 12 months, 57% believed attracting talent is among their company's biggest challenges, and 35% already expanded benefits to bolster employee retention.

Workers in the leisure and hospital industries had relatively high quit rates. In October 2021, the U.S. Bureau of Labor Statistics reported that food service workers' quit rates rose to 6.8%, which is well above the industry average of 4.1% over the last 20 years and still higher than the industry's quit peaks of 5% in 2006 and 2019. The retail industry had the second highest quit rates at 4.7%. From the start of the pandemic to November 2021, approximately one in five healthcare workers quit their jobs.

Amidst the Great Resignation, October 2021 saw a strike wave known as Striketober, with over 100,000 American workers participating in or preparing for strike action. While discussing Striketober, some economists described the Great Resignation as workers participating in a general strike against poor working conditions and low wages.

By August 2022, however, the U.S. workforce has surpassed its size from before the COVID-19 pandemic. Many American workers took advantage of the labor shortage to trade their current jobs for those with higher salaries, more benefits, and better schedules. Some have started or joined labor unions. A number of prospective employers are also offering paid training in order to attract recruits. Still, the recovery of employment has been uneven, as low-wage sectors—especially leisure, hospitality, retail, manufacturing, and education—lose jobs to those that offer higher income. Although retirees (who need to supplement their incomes) have returned at a rate not seen since 2019, it remains unclear whether workers aged 55 and over, people more likely to quit, will ever return. Unsatisfied with their current positions, a record number of Americans quit to start their own businesses, only to face an acute labor shortage they helped to create. In fact, small businesses are the most likely to struggle to find qualified recruits. Some 16 million Americans suffer from long COVID, and of these, 2 to 4 million are kept out of work because if it. The shortage of workers has exacerbated the disruption of the domestic supply chain of the United States.

In response to the problem, a number of firms have relocated to states with lower costs of doing business (and possibly with subsidies), a large pool of skilled workers, quality education, high standards of living, and good infrastructure. Wage growth has jumped; in December 2021, wage growth reached 4.5%, the highest since June 2001. The number of workers in positions earning less than US$29,000 has fallen noticeably compared to January 2020. Some employers in the fast food industry, like McDonald's, are providing more benefits, like college scholarships and healthcare benefits, to bring back workers. Still, many service-sector workers who got laid off during the pandemic have not returned. Public sector jobs have had higher worker retention as compared to private sector jobs, largely due to stronger benefits like paid family leave.

Productivity has dropped during the Great Resignation because even when employees stay, they are not as productive as they were in the past.

The early 2020s also saw faculty members are leaving academia for good, especially those from the humanities. (Also see the higher education bubble in the United States.)

In popular culture 
Fans and media outlets drew connections between the Great Resignation and Beyoncé's 2022 song "Break My Soul", specifically in the verse "Now I just fell in love / And I just quit my job".

See also 

 2021–2022 global supply chain crisis
 2021–2022 inflation surge
 American Rescue Plan Act of 2021
 COVID-19 recession
 Critique of work
 Great Reset
 Late capitalism
 Labor history of the United States
 Millennial socialism
 Refusal of work
 r/antiwork
 Quiet quitting

References

External links 

 Bureau of Labor Statistics resignation data

Economic impact of the COVID-19 pandemic
2021 in economics
2021 in international relations
Economic history